The 18th Regiment of the Bengal Native Infantry was a unit of the Bengal Native Infantry that was formed in 1776, then mutinied in 1857 and was disbanded.

Chronology 
1776 raised for the Vizier of Oude
1777 incorporated in HEIC service as the 23rd Battalion of Bengal Native Infantry
1781 became the 16th Regiment of Bengal Native Infantry
1784 became the 16th Regiment of Bengal Native Infantry
1786 became the 20th Battalion of Bengal Native Infantry
1796 became the 2nd Battalion 6th Regiment of Bengal Native Infantry
1824 became the 18th Regiment of Bengal Native Infantry 
1857 mutinied at Bareilly 31 May

In 1861, after the mutiny, the title was given to the Alipore Regiment which later became the 18th Infantry.

References

Honourable East India Company regiments
Bengal Native Infantry
1776 establishments in the British Empire